Związek Walki Zbrojnej (abbreviation: ZWZ; Union of Armed Struggle; also translated as Union for Armed Struggle, Association of Armed Struggle or Association for Armed Struggle) was an underground army formed in Poland following its invasion in September 1939 by Germany and the Soviet Union that opened World War II. It existed from 13 November 1939 until 14 February 1942, when it was renamed into Home Army (Armia Krajowa, AK).

ZWZ was created from an earlier organization, Service for Poland's Victory (SZP). In January 1940, it was divided into two parts:
areas under German occupation — commanded by Colonel Stefan Rowecki, headquartered in Warsaw;
areas under Soviet occupation — commanded by General Michał Karaszewicz-Tokarzewski,  headquartered in Lwów.

Formally, the ZWZ was directed from Paris, by General Kazimierz Sosnkowski (nom de guerre Jozef Godziemba), who after Poland's defeat escaped to France via Hungary. Due to practical problems, however, Sosnkowski's control of the organization was very limited. The instruction of General Sosnkowski, in which he ordered his subordinates to create regional branches of the ZWZ, was brought to Warsaw on 4 December 1939. According to Sosnkowski, the ZWZ was supposed to be a national military organization, without regard to political differences and social ranks. Furthermore, the idea of a national uprising at the moment of entry of regular Polish units was put forward by Sosnkowski and his staff.

After the fall of France, on 18 June 1940, General Wladyslaw Sikorski named Colonel Stefan Rowecki his deputy, with the right to take urgent decisions without consent of the Polish government-in-exile. Sikorski urged Rowecki to closely cooperate with leaders of political parties, gathered in the Political Consultative Committee. The headquarters of the ZWZ formally was under the authority of the Polish government in London, but in reality, military powers were in hands of officers who remained in the occupied country, and had good knowledge of the reality of Nazi- and Soviet-controlled Poland.

After the arrest of General Michal Tokarzewski-Karaszewicz, who was captured by the NKVD on the way from Warsaw to Lwow, the ZWZ in Eastern Poland was left without a leader. Following the Operation Barbarossa, the whole territory of the Second Polish Republic found itself under German occupation.

See also
Union of Active Struggle (founded 1908)

Notes

References
Norman Davies, God's Playground:  A History of Poland, in Two Volumes; Volume II: 1795 to the Present, New York, Columbia University Press, 1982, .

External links
 ZWIĄZEK WALKI ZBROJNEJ, Encyklopedia Interia
 ZWIĄZEK WALKI ZBROJNEJ, Encyklopedia PWN
 ZWIĄZEK WALKI ZBROJNEJ, Encyklopedia WIEM
1939-1942; Beginning of Secret Army; the ZWZ period
 „Polska Podziemna”: Związek Walki Zbrojnej

Military units and formations of Poland in World War II
Polish revolutionary organisations
1939 establishments in Poland
1942 disestablishments
Home Army